INAS 342 is an Indian Naval air squadron, operating unmanned aerial vehicles, based at INS Garuda, Kochi.

History 
Two different UAV's, IAI Heron and Searcher Mark II, were acquired from IAI Malat by the Indian Navy in December 2002. The aim of inducting these UAV's was to perform maritime reconnaissance, search & rescue, battle damage assessment and providing OTOHT data.

16 internal pilots, 11 observers, 8 external pilots, 6 technical officers and 75 technical and non-technical sailors underwent training in 2002 at IAI Malat. On 31 August 2002, the Intensive Flying and Trials Unit (IFTU) was established at INS Garuda and was tasked with the roles of aircraft acceptance, operator & crew training, evaluation & trials of aircraft and sensors, doctrine formulation, establishing operating & maintenance procedures.

Flight training commenced in January 2003 and the OEM withdrew gradually as the unit personnel began gaining expertise. Routine and training flying finally translated into operational exploitation and the unit started regularly participating in exercises off both coasts from ships and from various military and non-military airfields.

Training of technical officers and sailors was also taken up by the OJT cell to hand over the freshly acquired expertise to successive generations of maintainers.

On 6 January 2006, IFTU was formally commissioned as an operational squadron, INAS 342. The first Officer-in-Charge was Commander Rajesh Kawatra. Today, INAS 342 has evolved into a fully functional squadron and pioneered a new era in aviation.

INAS 342 has 12 Israeli-built IAI Herons and Searcher Mark IIs UAVs. The Searcher is a third-generation UAV. The Searcher MkII has a cruise speed of about 100 knots, a service ceiling of 20,000 feet and an 18-hour endurance. The Heron can touch speeds of over 100 knots with a service ceiling of 30,000 feet and an endurance of 40 hours.

Heron is the bigger version of Searcher MKII and has a wingspan of about 16 metres. The Searcher carries a modern and sophisticated electro optic camera and a communication intelligence payload. Heron is equipped with a maritime patrol radar. Both the UAVs have long endurance capabilities, can operate before and after sunset and beam real time live pictures of maritime targets.

References

Aircraft squadrons of the Indian Navy
Naval units and formations of India